Adolfo González (born 8 January 1952) is a former tennis player from Mexico.

Biography
González won medals in all three tennis events at the 1975 Pan American Games, including a silver in the men's singles. He also came second in the men's doubles with Raúl Contreras and won a bronze medal in the mixed doubles partnering Alejandra Vallejo.

During Mexico's 1976 Davis Cup campaign, González featured in a tie against the Caribbean team at home in Mexico City. He played in the doubles rubber, which he and partner Roberto Chávez won in straight sets, over Alan Price and Michael Valdez.

His best performance on the Grand Prix circuit came in 1981 at the Mexico City tournament, where he made it to the semi-finals, with wins over Cliff Letcher, Jimmy Arias and Klaus Eberhard.

Challenger titles

Singles: (1)

See also
List of Mexico Davis Cup team representatives

References

External links
 
 
 

1952 births
Living people
Mexican male tennis players
Pan American Games silver medalists for Mexico
Pan American Games bronze medalists for Mexico
Pan American Games medalists in tennis
Tennis players at the 1975 Pan American Games
Medalists at the 1975 Pan American Games